Terrance Lee Labonte (born November 16, 1956), nicknamed Texas Terry or The Iceman, is an American former stock car driver who raced from 1978 to 2014 in the former NASCAR Winston Cup and Sprint Cup Series (now called the NASCAR Cup Series). A two-time Cup Series champion and 1989 IROC champion, he is the older brother of 2000 Cup Series champion Bobby Labonte, and the father of former Nationwide Series driver Justin Labonte. He also co-owns a Chevrolet dealership in Greensboro, North Carolina with Rick Hendrick. He appeared on the CBS series The Dukes of Hazzard in 1984, where he played an unnamed pit crew member.

Early life 
Terry Labonte was born in Corpus Christi, Texas in 1956. He was introduced to racing through his father, who had worked on race cars as a hobby for his friends. He started racing quarter midgets when he was seven and won a national championship at nine before moving onto the local short tracks in a stock car as a teenager. Driving on both dirt and asphalt, he won track championships in his hometown, in Houston, and in San Antonio from 1975 to 1977. During this time he also met Louisiana businessman Billy Hagan.

Racing career

Hagan Racing 

Labonte’s first NASCAR race came in 1978 at Darlington Raceway. He qualified 19th in the No. 92 Duck Industries-sponsored Chevrolet and finished fourth that weekend. He ran four more races that season and had an additional two Top 10 finishes. In 1979, he competed for NASCAR Winston Cup Rookie of the Year honors along with Dale Earnhardt, Harry Gant, and Joe Millikan while driving the No. 44 Stratagraph-sponsored Chevrolet for Hagan. Although Labonte failed to win the top rookie award, he was one of three rookies to finish in the Top 10 in points. He ended the season with 13 Top 10 finishes. The following year, he won his first career Winston Cup race on Labor Day weekend at Darlington. He won $222,501 in prize money for the year and finished eighth in the final points standings. 

Labonte failed to return to victory lane over the next two years but didn't finish outside the Top 5 in the final standings. He won his second career race in 1983 in the Budweiser-sponsored Chevrolet. In 1984, his team received a sponsorship from Piedmont Airlines and he won races at Riverside International Raceway and Bristol Motor Speedway as well as clinching his first Winston Cup championship. He dropped to seventh in the final points in 1985. During that season, he made his Busch Series debut at Charlotte in the No. 17 Pontiac owned by Darrell Waltrip and won the  race. Waltrip asked Labonte to drive after deciding to focus his driving priorities solely on Winston Cup racing during what would be Waltrip's 307-point gain over Bill Elliott in the final eight races of the 1985 season.

Junior Johnson & Associates 

Labonte fell back to twelfth in the standings in 1986. Before season's end, he announced he was leaving Hagan's team to drive the No. 11 Budweiser-sponsored Chevrolet for Junior Johnson's team the next year. In his first season with this team, he earned four pole-positions and won the Holly Farms 400, leaping up to third in the final standings. He followed that up with a fourth-place points finish in 1988, as well as The Winston. In 1989, the team switched to Ford Thunderbirds. Despite two wins during the season, he fell back to tenth in the championship.

Precision Products Racing 
In 1990, he signed with Leo Jackson's Precision Products Racing team to drive the No. 1 Skoal Classic-sponsored Oldsmobile. He had four Top 5s and nine Top 10s and finished 15th in the points standings.

Terry Labonte scrapped plans for 1990 to run a self-owned independent team, because he couldn't land a full sponsorship, the News-Record of Greensboro, N.C. reported in 1990, and  he signed to the Precision Products Racing team.

Return to Hagan Racing 
Labonte came back to Hagan Racing to drive the No. 94 Sunoco-sponsored Oldsmobile in 1991, winning his first pole since 1988. He began 1992 with finishes inside the Top 8 in each of the first eight races. He had a total of four Top 5 finishes and 16 Top 10 finishes, ending the season eighth in points. In 1993, the team switched to the No. 14 Kellogg's-sponsored Chevrolet. While he had ten Top 10s, for the first time in his career, Labonte failed to finish a race in the Top 5 and he dropped to 18th in points.

On July 1, 1993, it was announced that Terry Labonte would be leaving Hagan Racing following 1993 to drive for Hendrick Motorsports in 1994.

Hendrick Motorsports 

After leaving Hagan Racing in 1993, Terry Labonte was signed to Hendrick Motorsports in 1994, where he began driving the No. 5 Kellogg's-sponsored Chevrolet Lumina. In 1995, the team switched to Chevrolet Monte Carlos and won three races including the fall Goody's 500 event at Bristol, where the front of Labonte's car was wrecked after Dale Earnhardt crashed into him in the final lap. In 1996, he broke Richard Petty’s streak for consecutive races after winning at North Wilkesboro. Despite only two victories, Labonte went on to win the championship, a record-setting twelve years after his first. Driving with a broken hand during the last two races of the season, Labonte and his younger brother Bobby were able to perform a dual victory lap at Atlanta Motor Speedway in the last race of the season; Bobby won the race and Terry won the championship on this race, making it the only time a driver and his sibling won the race and the championship at the same time.

Labonte posted 20 Top 10 finishes in 1997 and collected his only win of the season at the fall race at Talladega Superspeedway. In 1998, it was the final season to have Labonte's trademark mustache, where he went on to win the Pontiac Excitement 400 and finished ninth in points. With a win at his home track at Texas Motor Speedway and in the Sprint All-Star Race XV in 1999, Labonte finished 12th in points, the first time he had finished outside the Top 10 since 1993.

Labonte shaved his mustache off in 1999, where his most famous race was the 1999 Goody's Headache Powder 500 at Bristol. He was involved in one of the most infamous and controversial NASCAR finishes ever, when he was spun out by a lapped Darrell Waltrip while leading with ten laps to go when he slowed the field under caution. Labonte pitted for four tires and quickly recovered and was leading with one lap remaining. However, Dale Earnhardt, who was in second at the time, wrecked Labonte half-way to the checkered flag and won. Labonte finished eighth while wrecking. In victory lane, Dale Earnhardt maintained that it wasn't on purpose. In a post-race interview, Labonte didn't buy Earnhardt's excuses, angrily stating "[Earnhardt] never intends to take anybody out...it just happens that way."

The 2000 season saw Labonte's consecutive start streak broken at 655 after he suffered inner ear injuries in the Pepsi 400 and was forced to miss the Brickyard 400 and the Global Crossing @ The Glen. 2000 was also his first winless season since 1993. His younger brother Bobby won that year's championship. He began 2001 with two Top 6 finishes in the first seven races but finished 23rd in point. He dropped back to 24th in 2002 with one Top 5 finish and four Top 10's.

In 2003, Labonte won his first pole since 2000 at Richmond and won the Mountain Dew Southern 500 where 23 years earlier he won his first in 1980 at Darlington Raceway after leading the last 33 laps. This was only his second win in a crown jewel event (the other being in the Southern 500 at Darlington Raceway in 1980). That helped lead him to a tenth place spot in points. About 90% of the NASCAR fans have labeled the 2003 Southern 500 win as the most popular win of 2003.

The 2004 season was much more of a struggle for Labonte, and Hendrick Motorsports announced Kyle Busch as Labonte's replacement when he retired. Late in the 2004-season, Labonte announced that 2004 would be his final full-time year on the circuit and would run part-time schedules for the next two years. The part-time schedule was nicknamed "Shifting Gears: Lone Star Style".

Semi-retirement years

Hendrick Motorsports 

Labonte began his semi-retirement in 2005. He borrowed the number 44, his former number, from Petty Enterprises and ran Hendrick's No. 44 research and development car with some sponsorships from Kellogg's, Pizza Hut, and GMAC. His best finish in 2005 for Hendrick Motorsports came at Pocono Raceway, where he finished twelfth.

Labonte also ran ten races with Hendrick Motorsports research and development car No. 44 in 2006.

Joe Gibbs Racing 
Labonte also drove five races in the No. 11 FedEx-sponsored Chevrolet for Joe Gibbs Racing following the release of Jason Leffler, with a top finish of ninth at Richmond.

Hall of Fame Racing 
Labonte began the 2006 season driving the No. 96 Texas Instruments/DLP HDTV-sponsored Chevrolet Monte Carlo car for Hall of Fame Racing, a new team started by former Dallas Cowboys quarterbacks Roger Staubach and Troy Aikman. Labonte's past-champion's provisional guaranteed the team a starting spot in the first five races. Labonte's finishes in those races left the team thirtieth in points, sealing a spot for the team in each race as long as they remained in the top thirty-five. Tony Raines took over the driving duties for the No. 96 car and ran for the rest of the season, with the exception of the road-course races at Infineon Raceway and Watkins Glen International. Labonte's best finish of 2006 came at Infineon, where he finished third due to a fuel mileage gamble by Philippe Lopez, the crew chief of the No. 96 DLP/Texas Instruments-sponsored Chevrolet.

Michael Waltrip Racing 
During the 2007 season, Labonte drove three races for Michael Waltrip Racing, both road course events, and the Allstate 400 at the Brickyard, in the No.55 NAPA Auto Parts-sponsored Toyota Camry. His best finish in the No. 55 was thirtieth twice, at Indianapolis and Watkins Glen.

Petty Enterprises 
On May 11, 2008, it was announced that Labonte would drive the No. 45 car of Petty Enterprises for six races in the middle of the 2008 Sprint Cup season, replacing Kyle Petty on a temporary basis.  Labonte was reunited with brother Bobby, who was the regular driver of the No. 43 for Petty. Labonte posted two solid top-twenty runs in the six-race tenure, a sixteenth at Daytona and a seventeenth at Infineon, both the best finishes for the #45 car this season. It was later announced that he would drive for Petty again in the Brickyard 400 Labonte was back in the No. 45 car for Petty Enterprises when the Sprint Cup Series went to the Michigan International Speedway for the 3M Performance 400 on August 17, 2008. He would be back in the No. 45 car again for the AMP Energy 500 at the Talladega Superspeedway for the final time in the 2008 Sprint Cup Season. He would go on to post a seventeenth-place finish, even after sustaining severe damage in one of the multi-car accidents. Labonte's results in 2008 proved far better on average than the previous three seasons, while driving also part-time.

Gillett Evernham Motorsports 
Labonte drove the #10 Valvoline-sponsored car in place of Patrick Carpentier in The American Red Cross Pennsylvania 500.

Prism Motorsports 
It was reported first on January 23, 2009, that Labonte would attempt to make the Daytona 500 for Prism Motorsports, driving the No. 66 Window World-sponsored Toyota. The team announced they planned to race full-time with Dave Blaney after Daytona. Labonte started forty-third, and went a lap down. He managed to get his lap back and fought up to finish twenty-fourth in the rain-shortened event.

Carter/Simo Racing 
Starting at Indianapolis in 2009, Labonte drove the No. 08 Toyota for Carter/Simo Racing for four races.

Stavola Labonte Racing/Prism Motorsports 
It was reported that Labonte would be forming a new team with Bill Stavola, formerly the co-owner of Stavola Brothers Racing. In the team's debut, Labonte barely missed making the field at Richmond, but took the Gander Mountain sponsorship to the No. 55 Prism Motorsports car which had qualified thirty-seventh. Labonte would finish fortieth in the race after an accident forced him out. It is not known for sure what caused the demise of Stavola Labonte Racing, as the team seemed to dissolve sometime after the 2010 season.

Whitney Motorsports 
Labonte also raced at Phoenix in 2010 for Whitney Motorsports.

FAS Lane Racing/Go Fas Racing 
Entering 2011, it was announced that Frank Stoddard would be starting his own team, FAS Lane Racing, with Labonte driving the No. 32 U.S. Chrome-sponsored Ford Fusion in the Daytona 500. Labonte started forty-third and finished a respectable fifteenth. At the time, Labonte was semi-retired, but competed in seven additional races over the course of the year in the No. 32.

He returned to Stoddard's 32 car in 2012 where he would run all four restrictor plate races with C&J Energy Services as the sponsor. He finished with three top twenties out of the four starts, including a season-best sixteenth in the October race at Talladega Superspeedway. Labonte led the 2012 Daytona 500 briefly before being spun by Marcos Ambrose. He would continue on to finish eighteenth.

In 2013, Labonte would run five races for FAS Lane Racing, posting a best finish of nineteenth. In addition to running all four restrictor plate races, he ran at Bristol Motor Speedway in March, finishing twenty-fifth.

In 2014, FAS Lane Racing would merge with Go Green Racing to form Go Fas Racing, and announced that Labonte would again return to the No. 32 car for all four superspeedway events. He ran as high as sixth in the Daytona 500 before being swept up in a late crash and finishing twentieth. Before the race, Labonte called this his final Daytona 500 start. At the 2014 Coke Zero 400, his final start at Daytona, he dodged two huge wrecks and finished a solid eleventh place after the race was called 112 laps in due to rain. 

On October 17, Labonte announced the GEICO 500 is to be his 890th and final start. To commemorate the occasion, Go Fas Racing designed a car split into three designs: the Kellogg's design from his 1996 title run on the driver side, the Piedmont Airlines design from his 1984 championship year on the passenger side, and the Duck Industries design from his early career in the center. However, NASCAR did not allow the scheme, due to a rule stating cars must have the same colors on both the driver side and passenger side of the car for safety reasons; the team would switch to the former design, while being allowed to retain the center. Labonte qualified ninth, but because of the unapproved paint scheme, was forced to start at the tail end of the field. He would finish in thirty-third place, one lap down in his final race.

Competition in other series
In addition to his 22 wins in the Sprint Cup Series, Labonte has won 11 races in the Nationwide Series and 1 in the Craftsman Truck Series, as well as three all-star races: the Busch Clash in 1985 and The Winston (now the Sprint All-Star Challenge) in 1988 and 1999. He also won the IROC championship in 1989 with one win, and assisted the late Davey Allison to the 1993 IROC championship by driving his car to a 6th-place finish in the final race of the season.

Including his two championship seasons, he has finished in the top 10 in the year-end standings 17 times, and his top-five and top-ten totals approach 25 percent and 50 percent, respectively, of his total races. Labonte holds the record for most seasons between championships, with twelve seasons in between his 1984 & 1996 championships.

Labonte also collected class wins at the two most prestigious endurance races in the United States, the 24 Hours of Daytona and 12 Hours of Sebring, driving a GTO-class Chevrolet Camaro during the 1984 IMSA GT Championship season.

Honors

NASCAR Hall of Fame
On February 21, 2014, Labonte was nominated for the NASCAR Hall of Fame Class of 2015, along with 19 other candidates. This occurred not long after NASCAR revised the rules allowing current drivers eligibility into the Hall provided they are at least 55 years of age or have 30+ years of NASCAR experience.

After being passed over as a first-ballot inductee for the class of 2015, Labonte was inducted into the NASCAR Hall of Fame Class of 2016 on May 20, 2015. Joining Labonte in the 2016 class were Speedway Motorsports Executive Chairman Bruton Smith, and drivers Curtis Turner, Bobby Isaac, and Jerry Cook.

On January 26, 2017 Labonte was named to the Motorsports Hall of Fame of America.

Other
In 1998, the senior Labonte was named as one of NASCAR's 50 Greatest Drivers. A park was renamed for the Labonte brothers in their hometown of Corpus Christi in 2001, and they were chosen for entry into the Texas Sports Hall of Fame in 2002. Labonte supports a variety of charities and due to his efforts, the Ronald McDonald House in Corpus Christi, the Victory Junction Gang Camp near Randleman, North Carolina, and the Hendrick Marrow Program all have benefited.

TV and Movie Appearances 
In the 1983 Hal Needham / Burt Reynolds movie "Stroker Ace", Labonte appeared as himself (but credited as a "NASCAR Driver"), along with many other contemporary drivers.

Motorsports career results

NASCAR
(key) (Bold – Pole position awarded by qualifying time. Italics – Pole position earned by points standings or practice time. * – Most laps led.)

Cup Series

Daytona 500

Busch Series

SuperTruck Series

 Season still in progress
1 Ineligible for series points

24 Hours of Daytona 
(key)

See also
Iron man
Labonte Motorsports
List of all-time NASCAR Cup Series winners
List of NASCAR Sprint All-Star Race drivers
List of NASCAR Sprint Cup Series champions
List of people from Texas
NASCAR's 50 Greatest Drivers

References

External links

Terry Labonte at NASCAR.com

Living people
1956 births
Sportspeople from Corpus Christi, Texas
Racing drivers from Texas
24 Hours of Daytona drivers
NASCAR drivers
American Speed Association drivers
International Race of Champions drivers
Rolex Sports Car Series drivers
NASCAR Cup Series champions
NASCAR team owners
American automobile salespeople
Hendrick Motorsports drivers
Joe Gibbs Racing drivers
NASCAR Hall of Fame inductees
Evernham Motorsports drivers
Michael Waltrip Racing drivers